Branchio-oto-renal syndrome (BOR) is an autosomal dominant genetic disorder involving the kidneys, ears, and neck. It often has also been described as Melnick-Fraser syndrome.

Signs and symptoms
The signs and symptoms of branchio-oto-renal syndrome are consistent with underdeveloped (hypoplastic) or absent kidneys with resultant chronic kidney disease or kidney failure. Ear anomalies include extra openings in front of the ears, extra pieces of skin in front of the ears (preauricular tags), or further malformation or absence of the outer ear (pinna). Malformation or absence of the middle ear is also possible, individuals can have mild to profound hearing loss. People with BOR may also have cysts or fistulae along the sides of their neck.
In some individuals and families, renal features are completely absent. The disease may then be termed "branchio-oto syndrome" (BO syndrome).

Cause
The cause of branchio-oto-renal syndrome are mutations in genes, EYA1, SIX1, and SIX5 (approximately 40 percent of those born with this condition have a mutation in the EYA1 gene). Many different abnormalities in these genes have been identified.

Mechanism

The genetics of branchio-oto-renal syndrome indicate it is inherited in an autosomal dominant manner with variable clinical manifestations affecting branchial, renal, and auditory development. The varying clinical expression of the disease between different families suggests that multiple loci may be involved. In 1992, using genetic linkage studies, the BOR gene is identified on chromosome 8, Subsequently, another locus on human chromosome 14 is identified, and several mutations are reported in genes EYA1, SIX1, and SIX5. Autosomal dominant inheritance indicates that the defective gene responsible for a disorder is located on an autosome, and only one copy of the gene is sufficient to cause the disorder, when inherited from a parent who has the disorder. This gene is involved in many facets of embryonic development and is important in the normal formation of many organs and tissues, including the ears, and kidneys before birth.

Diagnosis
Diagnosis of BO syndrome or BOR syndrome is clinical, i.e. based on observing an appropriate combination of symptoms.
Only about half of patients have a detectable genetic abnormality, mostly in the EYA1 gene, SIX1 gene or the SIX5 gene.

Treatment

The treatment of branchio-oto-renal syndrome is done per each affected area (or organ). For example, a person with hearing problems should have appropriate supports and prompt attention for any inflammation of the ear.

A specialist should observe any kidney problems. Surgical repair may be needed depending on the degree of a defect or problem, whether a transplant or dialysis is needed.

Epidemiology
The epidemiology of branchio-oto-renal syndrome has it with a prevalence of 1/40,000 in Western countries. A 2014 review found 250 such cases in the country of Japan.

See also 
 Lachiewicz Sibley syndrome
 Branchio-oculo-facial syndrome

References

Further reading

External links 

Syndromes affecting hearing
Autosomal dominant disorders
Syndromes affecting the kidneys
Rare syndromes